The Loyal Lusitanian Legion (LLL) was a foreign volunteer corps of the British Army, organized with Portuguese émigrés in England, that fought in the Peninsular War. The LLL was created by the initiative of Portuguese Army Colonels José Maria Moura and Carlos Frederico Lecor – exiled in England after the occupation of Portugal by the Napoleonic Army – and the Portuguese Ambassador in London Chevalier de Sousa, with the support of the British government.

The LLL received the title "Loyal" to distinguish itself from the much larger Portuguese Legion, mobilized at the same time with the best units and officers of the disbanded Portuguese Army by direct order of Napoleon and which would fight for him in the several European campaigns.

The LLL included not only Portuguese, but also British (including its commanding officer, Colonel Robert Wilson) and Germans.

The Legion was organized in Plymouth, in July 1808 and landed in Oporto, Portugal in September of the same year. Between 1808 and 1811, as part of the Anglo-Portuguese Army, the LLL fought against the Napoleonic Imperial Armies in the Peninsular War. It was present at the battles of Busaco (Portugal, 27.9.1810; ca 2,000 men; commander: Baron Eben, German,* 1773; source: O. Pusch, 1986) and Talavera de la Reina, but was especially used to conduct raids and other irregular operations in the rear of the French Army, as part of Portuguese and Spanish militia forces.

The LLL was disbanded on 4 May 1811, after being transferred to the Portuguese Army, with its units being transformed into the 7th, 8th and 9th battalions of caçadores.

Organization
The Loyal Lusitanian Legion was organized as a regiment of light infantry, with an attached artillery battery. It included:
 Regimental staff, LLL;
 1st Battalion, LLL;
 2nd Battalion, LLL;
 Artillery corps, LLL.

Each battalion included 1,000 men in 10 companies. The artillery corps was a battery with six field guns and 80 men.

When the LLL was disbanded, the 1st battalion became the 7th Caçadores and the 2nd battalion the 8th Caçadores. The 9th Caçadores was organized with the rest of the Legion's men.

Uniforms
As a light infantry unit, the Loyal Lusitanian Legion received green uniforms similar to those of the British rifles regiments. Furthermore, green was the livery colour of the Portuguese Royal House of Braganza, to whom the Legion remained loyal.

References
1º Batalhão da LLL, Arqnet
2º Batalhão da LLL, Arqnet
RODRIGUES, Manuel A. Ribeiro, Leal Legião Lusitana
CHARTRAND, René, YOUNGHUSBAND, Bill, The Portuguese Army of the Napoleonic Wars (2), Osprey, 2000

Military units and formations established in 1808
Military units and formations of the Napoleonic Wars
Military units and formations of the Peninsular War
British light infantry
Peninsular War
Portuguese Army